Schuby is a municipality in the district Schleswig-Flensburg, in Schleswig-Holstein in northern Germany. It is only a few kilometres west from Schleswig.

The name comes from the Danish "Skovby", meaning the "Village in the Woods". Schuby is located on the Bundesautobahn 7, from which it has its "own" exit.

Schuby is part of the Amt ("collective municipality") Arensharde.

The ancestors of Stanford Computer Scientist Donald Knuth emigrated from Schuby.

Carles Puigdemont was arrested at a gas station in this town.

References

Schleswig-Flensburg